The Encyclopedia of the History of Arabic Science is a three-volume encyclopedia covering the history of Arabic contributions to science, mathematics and technology which had a marked influence on the Middle Ages in Europe. It is written by internationally recognized experts in the field and edited by Roshdi Rashed in collaboration with Régis Morelon.

Volume one covers "Astronomy--Theoretical and applied". Volume two covers "Mathematics and the Physical Sciences". Volume three covers "Technology, Alchemy, and the Life Sciences".

Editions
 French edition: ":fr:Histoire des sciences arabes", 3 vol., Le Seuil, Paris, 1997,.
 Arabic edition: "Mawsu‘a Tarikh al-‘ulum al-‘arabiyya", 3 vol., Markaz Dirasat al-Wahda al-‘arabiyya, Beirut, 1997, (978-9953-450-73-5).

Contributors 
A partial list of contributors include:
Volume 1
 R. Morelon and George Saliba (Arabic astronomy)
 David A. King (astronomy in Islamic society)
 Edward Stewart Kennedy  (mathematical geography)
 J. Vernet and J. Samsó (Arabic science in Andalusia)
 H. Grosset-Grange (Arabic nautical sciences)
Volume 2
 A. S. Saidan (numeration and arithmetic)
 Boris A. Rosenfeld and A. P. Yushkevich (geometry)
 J.-C. Chabrier and M. Rozhanskaya (music and statics)
 M.-Th. Debarnot (trigonometry, algebra)
 Roshdi Rashed (geometrical optics)
 G. Russell (physiological optics)
Volume 3
 Donald Routledge Hill (engineering)
 A. Miquel (geography)
 Toufic Fahd (botany and agriculture)
 G. Anawati (Arabic alchemy)
 E. Savage-Smith (medicine)
 F. Micheau (scientific institutions in the medieval Near East)
 J. Jolivet (classifications of the sciences)
 M. Mahdi (historiography)
 B. Goldstein (heritage of Arabic science in Hebrew)
 H. Hugonnard-Roche, A. Allard, D. Lindberg, R. Halleux, and D. Jacquart (Western reception of various Arabic sciences)

Notes

References 
 J. L. Berggren. "Reviewed work(s): Encyclopedia of the History of Arabic Science by Roshdi Rashed". Journal of the American Oriental Society. Vol. 120, No. 2 (Apr. - Jun., 2000), pp. 282-283.
 Sonja Brentjes. "Reviewed work(s): Encyclopedia of the History of Arabic Science by Roshdi Rashed". Technology and Culture. Vol. 40, No. 2 (Apr., 1999), pp. 399-401.
 Charles Burnett. "Reviewed work(s): Encyclopedia of the History of Arabic Science by Roshdi Rashed; Régis Morelon". The British Journal for the History of Science. Vol. 31, No. 1 (Mar., 1998), pp. 72–73.

External links
 Volume 1
 Volume 2
 

History Arabic Science
History Arabic Science
History Arabic Science
Science in the medieval Islamic world
Works about the history of mathematics
20th-century encyclopedias